Skylar M.-Y. Park (born 6 June 1999) is a Canadian taekwondo athlete. She won the gold medal at the 2018 Pan American Taekwondo Championships on the women's 57 kg weight category. She represented Canada at the 2020 Summer Olympics in the women's 57 kg weight category. Her father is Korean and her mother is Italian with Chilean heritage.

Career 
In 2016, World Taekwondo released an article about her, after her performance on home soil winning the gold medal at the 2016 World Taekwondo Junior Championships in Burnaby, Canada, naming her a "Star of Tomorrow".

She competed in the women's featherweight event at the 2022 World Taekwondo Championships held in Guadalajara, Mexico.

References

External links
 

1999 births
Living people
Canadian female taekwondo practitioners
Canadian people of Chilean descent
Canadian people of Italian descent
Canadian people of South Korean descent
Canadian sportspeople of Korean descent
Sportspeople from Winnipeg
World Taekwondo Championships medalists
Pan American Games medalists in taekwondo
Pan American Games silver medalists for Canada
Taekwondo practitioners at the 2019 Pan American Games
Pan American Taekwondo Championships medalists
Medalists at the 2019 Pan American Games
Taekwondo practitioners at the 2020 Summer Olympics
Olympic taekwondo practitioners of Canada
21st-century Canadian women